Intelligibility may refer to:

Mutual intelligibility, in linguistics
Intelligibility (communication)
Intelligibility (philosophy)

See also

Immaterialism, in philosophy
Incorporeality